The Tashkent Files – Who Killed Shastri? is a 2019 Indian Hindi-language thriller film about the death of former Prime Minister of India Lal Bahadur Shastri; written and directed by Vivek Agnihotri. The film stars Shweta Basu Prasad, Naseeruddin Shah, Mithun Chakraborty, Pankaj Tripathi, Pallavi Joshi, Prakash Belawadi and Mandira Bedi. It was released on 12 April 2019 to overwhelmingly negative reviews but emerged as a box-office sleeper hit and received two National Film Awards.

Plot 

A young journalist, Raagini Phule, whose career is threatened and looking for a scoop receives help from an anonymous informer which leads into the formation of a panel of experts by the government, which also includes Raagini, to investigate the truth about the death of India's former prime minister Lal Bahadur Shastri. The information collected are scrutinised and debated over by the panel in an attempt to unravel the truth.

Cast

Production
The film was announced in January 2018 as India's first "crowd-sourced" thriller. Principal photography began in January 2018. In February 2018 he invited from the public any information, book, link or memory related to Lal Bahadur Shastri’s mysterious death in Tashkent to help him solve the 'decades old enigma' surrounding the death of former Prime Minister of India. Books referenced for and referred in the film include Political Mysteries by K. R. Malkani, Conversations with the Crow by Gregory Douglas, and Mitrokhin Archive by Vasili Mitrokhin.

Marketing and release
First poster was released on 19 March 2019, and on the same occasion, the release date was announced as 12 April 2019. The film was also simultaneously released on video on demand service ZEE5. Agnihotri touted the film to be the first instalment of his trilogy of "untold stories of independent India", which is followed by The Kashmir Files (2022) and an upcoming film The Delhi Files.

Reception

Critical response 
The Tashkent Files received overwhelmingly negative reviews. On review aggregator Rotten Tomatoes, the film holds a 0% approval rating based on 8 reviews.

Devesh Sharma of Filmfare gave two and half stars out of five; it was a 'melodramatic' episode with loud and over the top acting coupled with bombastic dialogues. Sharma found the film to be biased against a certain political party and wondered about its release during the national elections, which were running concurrently.

Writing for Scroll.in, Nandini Ramnath found it to be a politically motivated work that did not have any rigor and failed to be an effective conspiracy thriller. Saibal Chatterjee, writing for NDTV rated the film with half star out of five — the research that went into the production was equivalent of a Google search film-making and overall, it was "junk." Jyoti Sharma Bawa, reviewing for the Hindustan Times rated it one out of five stars and reiterated Chatterjee. Mid-Day gave one and a half stars out of five — all the research that went into the work was derived from internet, esp. social media. 

A review over India Today rated it one out of five stars and noted it to be a politically motivated film that did not have any logic and might be easily dispensed with. A review over The Hindu noted it to be an ideological slideshow that exploited Shastri's death to attack left, secular and socialist ideologies and institutions and though based on an engaging topic, was a 'hotch-potch of hearsay, juvenile arguments' that ultimately lend to utter confusion rather than any conviction. Another review over News18 India rated it one out of five stars and noted it to be a politically motivated film with unconvincing arguments, that made for a dull watch.

A review in The First Post asserted it to be a politically motivated film and rated it two out of five stars. Noting Agnihotri to neither have the finesse nor the potency to sketch a conspiracy thriller, the reviewer deemed it to be a cheap trick, that was high on hysteria but lacked logic amidst a focus-less frenzied storytelling that did not venture beyond the realms of Google. A review in The Indian Express deemed it to be the ideal politically-motivated fiction for the 'post-truth, fake news era' — a series of eye-roll moments with unintentionally hilarious dialogues. ThePrint found it to be a shoddy jab at film-making that harnessed a mish-mash of unformed characters and incomplete plots devoid of logic. Bollywood Hungama gave one and a half stars out of five.

Anusha Iyengar, reviewing for Times Now, gave two out of five stars, praising the story but taking issues with over-the-top dramatization that reeked of amateurish storytelling. Manavi Kapur, reviewing the film at Business Standard, found it unworthy for even a daytime opera slot. Shilajit Mitra, reviewing for The New Indian Express remarked it to be an exhausting head-spin of a political propaganda, that became weirder with time. Stutee Ghosh of The Quint found it to be a prejudiced, amateurish and cringe-worthy film with an uninspiring storytelling that banked on crowd-sourced research; she rated one star out of five.

Box office 
The film became a box-office sleeper hit.

Accolades

Soundtrack 

The music of the film is composed by Rohit Sharma while the lyrics are penned by Aazad, Rohit Sharma and Vivek Agnihotri.

Who Killed Shastri?
Who Killed Shastri?: The Tashkent Files is a non-fiction book by director Vivek Agnihotri about his research for the film and outlines various theories about the death of Lal Bahadur Shastri. It was released in August 2020 by Bloomsbury India.

References

External links
 
 
 

Indian thriller films
2010s Hindi-language films
2019 thriller films
Cultural depictions of prime ministers of India
Cultural depictions of Indian men
Films directed by Vivek Agnihotri
Hindi-language thriller films
Films about conspiracy theories
Conspiracy theories in India